Man of the World is an international male beauty pageant which began in 2017 that brings forth advocacy, which give an emphasis to the importance of education and career development. The pageant was organized by the Prime Event Productions Philippines foundation (PEPPs) which also organizes the annual Misters of Filipinas pageant.

The current Man of the World titleholder is Aditya Khurana of India who was crowned on 18 June 2022.

Titleholders

Country/territory by number of wins 

Notes
 Dethroned,  Took over title

 Daniel Georgiev of Bulgaria who was crowned as Man of the World 2019 was dethroned because he declined to sign an exclusive contract with Prime Event Productions Philippines (PEPPs), which organizes the pageant. Jin Kyu Kim of South Korea, then First Runner-Up, was formally crowned as the new Man of the World 2019 on July 29, 2020, due to pageant rules stipulating that the 1st Runner-Up will take over if Man of the World does not fulfill his duties. Prior to this result, each runner-up moved one position so Brazil was the new First Runner-Up, the Czech Republic is Second Runner-Up and the Philippines is the new Third Runner-Up.

See also 
 Manhunt International
 Mister World
 Mister International
 Mister Supranational
 Mister Global

References 

 
2017 establishments in the Philippines
Annual events in the Philippines
Male beauty pageants